A curlicue, or alternatively curlycue, in the visual arts, is a fancy twist, or curl, composed usually from a series of concentric circles.  It is a recurring motif in architecture (as decoration to the lintel/architrave above a door), in calligraphy and in general scrollwork. The word can also refer to a specific kind of origami, made out of a single strip of paper that can be transformed in many geometric shapes.

Examples

See also
Scrollwork
Arabesque (European art)
Swash (typography)
Calligraphy, in which curlicues are a frequent adornment of lavish text
Sinhala script, the script used to write the Sinhala language, composed almost entirely of curlicues

Visual motifs
Ornaments